Stitch, Stitches or Stitched may refer to:

Medical uses
Stitch, a surgical suture, a medical device used to hold body tissues together after an injury or surgery
Cervical cerclage, also known as a cervical stitch
Husband stitch, a purported historical surgical procedure
Seton stitch, a procedure used to aid the healing of fistulae
Side stitch, an intense stabbing pain during exercise
Stitch method, a minimally invasive procedure for pinning protruding ears

Textile arts
Stitch (textile arts), a single loop of thread or yarn
List of knitting stitches
List of sewing stitches

People
Stitches (rapper), Phillip Nickolas Katsabanis (born 1995), American rapper
 Jacob Duran, known as Stitch, a boxing cutman

Arts, entertainment, and media

Fictional characters
 Stitch (Lilo & Stitch), the title alien from Disney's Lilo & Stitch franchise
 Stitch, a fictional mutant in Alpha Flight comics
 Stitch, a boy in the Horrible Histories (2001 TV series)
 Stitch Rayburn, a character from The Young and the Restless
 Vikhor "Stitch" Kuzmin, an antagonist and multiplayer character from Call of Duty: Black Ops Cold War
 Stitches, a playable character in the video game Heroes of the Storm
 Stitches, a character in The Chica Show

Films and television
 Lilo & Stitch (franchise), alternately named Stitch, an American Disney media franchise
 Stitch!, a Japanese anime spin-off 
 Stitch! The Movie, a 2003 American direct-to-video animated science fiction comedy film and pilot to Lilo & Stitch: The Series
 Stitched (film), 2011 horror short film
 Stitches (1985 film), comedy film
 Stitches (2011 film), short film
 Stitches (2012 film), horror film
 Stitches (2019 film), Serbian film

Literature
 Stitches (book), a memoir by David Small, 2009
 Stitches: The Journal of Medical Humour, a Canadian humour magazine

Music
 Stitch, a 1995 album by Klinik
 Stitches, a 2003 album by The Boggs
 Stitches (album), a 2013 album by Califone
 "Stitches" (Orgy song), 1999
 "Stitches" (Shawn Mendes song), 2015
 The Stitches, an American punk rock band

Other uses
 The Stitch, a proposed engineering project in Atlanta, U.S.
 Stitch and glue, a simple boat building method
 Stitches (store), a Canadian retailer
 Stitches, deep laughter
 Image stitching, the process of combining multiple photographic images
 Network stitching, a computing orchestration technique

See also
 Cross stitches
 Cross-stitch
 
 
 Stitch up (disambiguation)
 Stitcher Radio